Bocchoropsis pharaxalis is a moth in the family Crambidae. It was described by Herbert Druce in 1895. It is found in Costa Rica.

The forewings and hindwings are cream coloured, each crossed by a series of zigzag pale brown lines. The costal margin and apex of the forewings is yellowish and the marginal line of both wings is dark brown.

References

Moths described in 1895
Spilomelinae